HMS Aberdare was the name ship of her sub-class of the Hunt-class minesweepers built for the Royal Navy during World War I. She survived both World Wars to be scrapped in 1947.

Design and description
The Aberdare sub-class were enlarged versions of the original Hunt-class ships with a more powerful armament. The ships displaced  at normal load. The ships' complement consisted of 74 officers and ratings.

The ships had two vertical triple-expansion steam engines, each driving one shaft, using steam provided by two Yarrow boilers.

The Aberdare sub-class was armed with a quick-firing (QF)  gun forward of the bridge and a QF twelve-pounder (76.2 mm) anti-aircraft gun aft. Some ships were fitted with six- or three-pounder guns in lieu of the twelve-pounder.

Construction and career
HMS Aberdare, named after the eponymous Welsh town, was built by the Ailsa Shipbuilding Company at its shipyard in Troon, Ayrshire. She was launched on 29 April 1918, and completed on 3 October 1918.

Aberdare was sent to the Mediterranean Sea on commissioning, joining the British Aegean Squadron, but was paid off into reserve at Malta on 26 November 1919.

Aberdare was placed into reserve at Singapore on 4 April 1937, and in February 1939, remained in reserve as part of the 2nd Minesweeping Flotilla at Singapore. In 1943 Aberdare was part of the 2nd M/S Flotilla based at Alexandria. During that year the flotilla swept minefields outside Mersa Matruh and other harbours in Libya, and off Malta and the south coast of Sicily. From January to September 1944 the flotilla was engaged in sweeping an inshore channel from Taranto round the heel of Italy and thence up the Adriatic coast as far north as Ancona.

From 1945 to 1947, Aberdare was used for harbour service at Malta. She was sold to the Belgian company Dohmen & Habets for mercantile use on 13 March 1947.

Notes

References
 
 
 
 
 

 

Hunt-class minesweepers (1916)
Royal Navy ship names
1918 ships
Ships built on the River Clyde
1918 in Scotland